Sound & Vision India is an Indian dubbing studio group in India, with their main studio located in Andheri, Mumbai. They have dubbed for many live action and animated theatrical or television films, series and documentaries.

History
Sound & Vision India was founded in 1992 by Leela Roy Ghosh and her daughter Mona Ghosh Shetty. They have been dubbing for TV shows, TV channels and movie producers present worldwide.

Sound & Vision India mainly adapts foreign content into several languages such as being translated to English, Hindi, Tamil and Telugu. They have also dubbed foreign productions into Urdu, Marathi, Bengali, Gujarati, Malayalam and recently, they are now also dubbing productions into Punjabi, with the first project that was done, was the film: A Good Day to Die Hard.`

The company mostly hires different English, Hindi, Tamil and Telugu language-speaking voice artists to dub for the character roles and additional character roles in its language-dubbed adaptations of foreign content, mostly for films and TV programs that were made outside of India. Hindi dubs are usually done in Western Indian states such as Mumbai, while Tamil and Telugu are done in the southern states of India and also in Sri Lanka. They have also dubbed Indian films into other languages, for example, dubbing Tamil films into Hindi, or dubbing Hindi films into Bengali.

Sometimes this company also does post-production for some Bollywood or other films made in another region of India that are already shot in the same language due to some reasons. Sometimes certain actors can't convey their voices to certain tones, accents or dialects well enough due to either temporal health issues, certain conditions that prevents actors to transmit through their roles, or by all means of disusing their voices. That is why dubbing artists are hired and being called-in to dub for corresponding actors to resolve the solution, depending on how the director wants it to be, whenever that film needs to be into the process of ADR or not.

Dubbing Work

Live action films

Animated films

Animated series

Live action television series

Clients
The following are some of the company's clients:

List of clients that this dubbing studio is partners with:
 Ashutosh Gowariker Production
 Yash Raj Films
 ETV Network
 Cartoon Network India
 Cartoon Network Pakistan
 Pogo
 Toonami Asia
 PVR Cinemas
 Crunchyroll
 Film Kraft
 Sagar Arts
 Universal Studios Inc.
 Universal Animation Studios
 Warner Bros. Pictures
 Warner Bros. Animation
 New Line Cinema
 MVP Entertainment
 PVR Pictures
 Star India
 Star TV Network
 Sony Entertainment Television India
 Zee TV
 Columbia Pictures
 Tristar Pictures
 Buena Vista International
 Sony Pictures Networks India
 BBC World Service
 Sony Pictures Entertainment
 Sony Pictures Television International
 Walt Disney Studios
 20th Century Studios
 UTV Software Communications
 Fox Star Studios
 DQ Entertainment
 DreamWorks Pictures
 DreamWorks Animation
 Paramount Pictures
 Multivision Multimedia
 Metro Goldwyn Mayer
 Nickelodeon India
 Nickelodeon Pakistan
 Sonic-Nickelodeon
 Viacom 18
 Netflix
 Filmkraft Productions Pvt. Ltd
 PVR Cinemas

List of voice actors
This is a list of voice actors that are currently employed for this dubbing studio and/or have contributed to films being dubbed by this studio, and the language that they use. Both Male artists and Female voice actors are listed.

Male voice actors

Female voice actors

See also
 Leela Roy Ghosh † – The Founder and Former President of the studio, who was also a dubbing artist and dubbing director herself, before her death.
 Mona Ghosh Shetty – The daughter of Leela, who is now current president of the studio and is also a dubbing artist.
 Dubbing (filmmaking)
 List of Indian dubbing artists

References

External links
 Official Website 

Indian dubbing studios
Companies based in Mumbai
Entertainment companies established in 1992
Indian companies established in 1992
1992 establishments in Maharashtra